Armenia competed at the 2004 Summer Paralympics in Athens, Greece. The team included two athletes, one man and one woman, neither of whom won a medal.

Sports

Archery

|-
|align=left|Marine Hakobyan
|align=left|Women's individual W1/W2
|101
|16
|
|L 101-142
|colspan=5|did not advance
|}

Powerlifting

See also
Armenia at the Paralympics
Armenia at the 2004 Summer Olympics

References 

Nations at the 2004 Summer Paralympics
2004
Summer Paralympics